Giertz is a surname. Notable people with the surname include:

Bo Giertz (1905–1998), Swedish Lutheran theologian, novelist and bishop
Caroline Giertz (born 1958), Swedish author and television presenter
Simone Giertz (born 1990), Swedish inventor, maker, robotics enthusiast, TV host, and professional YouTuber